This is a list of properties and districts in the western municipalities of Puerto Rico that are listed on the National Register of Historic Places. It includes places along the western coast, and on islands, and on the western slope of Puerto Rico's Cordillera Central.

The area covered spans 12 municipalities: Moca, Aguadilla, Aguada, Rincón, Añasco, Mayagüez, Hormigueros, San Germán, Sábana Grande, Guánica, Lajas and Cabo Rojo.

Names of places given are as they appear in the National Register, reflecting name as given in NRHP application at the date of listing. Note, the National Register name system does not accommodate Spanish á, ñ and other letters.

Aguada 

|}

Aguadilla 

|}

Former listings

|}

Añasco 

|}

Cabo Rojo 

|}

Guánica 

|}

Hormigueros 

|}

Lajas 

|}

Mayagüez 

|}

Former listings

|}

Moca 

|}

Rincón 

|}

Sabana Grande 

|}

San Germán 

|}

See also

 National Register of Historic Places listings in Puerto Rico
 Historic preservation
 History of Puerto Rico
 National Register of Historic Places listings in southern Puerto Rico
 National Register of Historic Places listings in northern Puerto Rico
 National Register of Historic Places listings in eastern Puerto Rico
 National Register of Historic Places listings in central Puerto Rico
 National Register of Historic Places listings in San Juan, Puerto Rico

Notes

References

External links
Puerto Rico State Historic Preservation Office, National Register of Historic Places site
National Park Service, National Register of Historic Places site

Western